Melkadze is a Georgian surname. Notable people with the surname include:

 Georgi Melkadze (born 1997), Russian footballer
 Levan Melkadze (born 1979), Georgian footballer
 Razhden Melkadze (born 1983), Russian footballer

Georgian-language surnames